Keshoraipatan is a city located in the state of Rajasthan, India. The town is famous for the temple of Keshav Rai Ji Maharaj or Lord Vishnu which lies on banks of the Chambal River.
The town is 20 km from the well known education hub of India, Kota.
Mratunjaya Mahadev temple is another important shrine of the town. The temple is one of the oldest temples of Rajasthan. There is an very old Jain temple of lord munisuvrat in the city . Kalyanrai temple is old temple of Keshavraiji. Here is a Teela (Knoll in English) where coins and many ancient things are found. There is "pandav shala" also located here. It is said that in exile period Pandavs came here.
Kartik Poornima, Bundi Utsav, Taijaji Ki Ghodi and Dhol Gyaras are some famous festivals in Keshoraipatan. Many devotees take a bath in the Chambal River during Kartik poornima.

Demographics 
Rajasthani and Hindi Punjabi are the local languages here.
According to the census of 2011,the population of the town is 24,627.
There are 25 wards in the town, majority holders are from Indian National Congress (INC).
Municipality Elections were held and current Chairman is Kanhaiya Lal Karad from Congress (2021-2025).

Tourism  

 Keshoraipatan Jain temple is a famous Jain temple dedicated to Munisuvrata, twentieth Tirthankara of Jainism. The temple considered a fine example of architecture and detailed sculptures. Nemichandra, a 10th century Jain Acharya, composed Laghudravya Saṁgraha here.

 Shri Keshav Rai ji Temple was built in 1641 by Rao Raja Chattar Sal of Bundi. The architecture and sculptures of the temple are unique. It is located at the bank of the Chambal River where the river touches the temple in a half-moon shape. The main Pujari (Mathaadheesh) takes care of the management and spiritual activities of the entire series of temples as per the legacy and the culture. This also gets the support from Devsthan department, Govt of Rajasthan.

Education

Schools 
 Keshav Bal Vidya Niketen Sr. Sec. School
 Govt. Sr. Sec. School, Keshorai Patan
 Govt. Girls Sr. Sec. School, Keshorai Patan
 Aryan Academy Convent School
 Global Paramount School
 Modern Public School
 National Public School
 Shiv Jyoti Secondary School
 Saraswati Vidya Mandir
 Ideal Public School
 Indian Convent School (ICS)
 Ajay Convent School

Colleges 
 Patan Girls College, Keshoraipatan
 Aazad B.ed. College, Bundi
 Government Post Graduate College Of Bundi

Computer Institutes 
 Jai Sai Nath Computer Coaching Institute
 Shree Radhe Krishna Computer Center

Transport

Train
Keshorai Patan Railway Station, Gurla West Railway Station are the very nearby railway stations to Keshoraipatan. However Kota Jn Rail Way Station is a major railway station  near to Keshoraipatan.

Bus
Shri Keshav Bus Stand is the major bus stand in Keshoraipatan.

Boat
The Chambal River is the major river here, one can visit via boat.

See also
Sarsala

References

Citations

Sources 
 
 
 

Cities and towns in Bundi district